Ratthaphong Phoorisit, known by his stage name ยังโอม (born 24 October 1998 —) is a popular Hip-Hop singer from Thailand. He has many popular songs including Doo White, Choey Moey, Thararat etc.

Early life and career
He was born on 24 October 1998 in Bangkok, Thailand. He finished his secondary school degree from Wat Tha Thong secondary school, but he didn't study in university. He started performing on stage since his first year in secondary school, when he started composing. Until the end of secondary school, he recorded in the studio and posted his songs on social media. His stage name is "Youngohm," as popular rapper names in the west use "Young" in their name. He joined his friends in a contest in the rap show Rap is Now season 2. Although he didn't win the competition, he started to become a popular entertainer.

In 2017, he released Choey Moey(), which received 1,000,000 views on YouTube, and first class in charts by JOOX. In 2018, he was received JOOX Thailand Music Awards, Hip-hop great songs, from song title Choey Moey, and he was featured in songs by Getsunova and Fucking Hero.

In 2019, his song Doo White has been watched on YouTube over 182,000,000 times, and another one of his songs, Thararat, received 25,000,000 views on YouTube in the first week after its posting.

Discography

Single
 Choey Moey (2017)
 Doo White (2019)
 Thararat (2019)

Album
 BANGKOK LEGACY (2020)
 THATTHONG SOUND (2023)

References

1998 births
Living people
People from Bangkok
21st-century Thai male singers
Thai rappers